Brimble is a surname. Notable people with the surname include:

 Allister Brimble (born 1970), British composer
 L. J. F. Brimble (1904–1965), English botanist and writer
 Margaret Brimble (born 1961), New Zealand chemist
 Nick Brimble (born 1944), English actor
 Wilfred Brimble (1913–1999), American rugby league player

See also
 Bramble (disambiguation)
 Brimble Pit and Cross Swallet Basins
 Death of Dianne Brimble